Brey may refer to:

People
 August Brey (1864–1937), German politician
 Betty Brey (1931–2015), American swimmer
 Carol A. Brey-Casiano, American librarian
 Carter Brey (born 1954), American cellist
 Claire Du Brey (1892–1993), American actress
 Mariano Rajoy Brey (born 1955), Spanish politician
 Mike Brey (born 1959), American college basketball coach
 Patrick Brey, Brazilian football player
 Ricardo Brey (born 1955), Cuban artist

Places
 Brey, Rhineland-Palatinate, Germany
 Brey-et-Maison-du-Bois, France

See also
 Bray (disambiguation)